Muhammad Ramadhan Sananta (born 27 November 2002) is an Indonesian professional footballer who plays as a striker for Liga 1 club PSM Makassar and the Indonesia national team.

Club career

Persikabo 1973
He was signed for Persikabo 1973 to play in the Liga 1 in the 2021 season. Sananta made his league debut on 3 February 2022 in a match against Bali United at the Ngurah Rai Stadium, Denpasar.

PSM Makassar
Sananta was signed for PSM Makassar to play in Liga 1 in the 2022–23 season. He made his league debut on 15 August 2022 in a match against RANS Nusantara at the Pakansari Stadium, Cibinong. On 29 August 2022, Sananta scored his first league goal for PSM Makassar with scored a brace in a 5–1 win over Persib Bandung at Parepare. On 10 September 2022, he scored the opening goal in a 3–0 home win over Persebaya Surabaya.

On 14 January 2023, Sananta scored a brace in a 4–0 win over PSS Sleman; the latter result saw PSM Makassar move to 1st position in the league table. On 25 January, he coming as a substitutes for Akbar Tanjung and made his first assist to Everton Nascimento in PSM's 4–2 away lose over Persija Jakarta. Five days later, Sananta scored equalizer in a 3–1 home win over RANS Nusantara. On 9 February, he scored in a 4–1 over PS Barito Putera. Five days later, Sananta scored another equalizer in a 2–1 away win over Persib at Pakansari Stadium, with his 1 goal, he has scored a total of 3 goals in the two encounters that led to Persib's two defeats against PSM Makassar. On 19 February, Sananta scored the winning goal in a 2–1 win over Persik Kediri, at the age of 20, he is the only purely local striker competing in the Liga 1 top scorer list this season. On 9 March, Sananta scored another the winning goal in a 0–1 away win over former club Persikabo 1973, scoring a penalty in the injury time of second half. This result makes PSM Makassar likely to win the 2022–23 Liga 1 with nine consecutive wins, while equaling Bali United's record in 2017 Liga 1.

International career
On 24 September 2022, Sananta made his first cap for the Indonesia national team for a friendly match against Curacao in a 3-2 win.

In December 2022, Sananta was included in the final 23-man squad for the 2022 AFF Championship by Shin Tae-Yong. On 26 December, Sananta scored his debut goal against Brunei in a 7–0 win on the group stage.

Career statistics

Club

Notes

International

International goals

References

External links
 Ramadhan Sananta at Soccerway
 Ramadhan Sananta at Liga Indonesia

2002 births
Living people
Liga 1 (Indonesia) players
PSM Makassar players
Indonesian footballers
Persikabo 1973 players
Association football forwards
Indonesia international footballers
People from the Riau Islands